Cully is a neighborhood in the Northeast section of Portland, Oregon.  The neighborhood, as well as NE Cully Blvd. that runs diagonally through it, is named after English stonemason Thomas Cully (1810–1891), an early settler.  Cully borders Sunderland, Concordia, and Beaumont-Wilshire on the west, Portland International Airport on the north, Sumner on the east, and Rose City Park and Roseway on the south.

Neighborhood parks include Sacajawea Park (1985), Rigler Community Garden (2004), Kʰunamokwst Park (2015), and Whitaker Ponds Nature Park (1998).  Nevertheless, Cully has the smallest amount of parkland per capita, and largest population living more than one-half mile from a park, of any Portland neighborhood. The Thomas Cully Park Community Garden celebrated its grand opening on October 18, 2012.

Rose City Cemetery, founded in 1906, occupies the southwest corner of the neighborhood.  Within its grounds is the Japanese Cemetery, which is maintained independently by the Japanese Ancestral Society of Portland.

References

External links
 Let Us Build Cully Park! Community Garden video about the Cully Park Community Garden (2013)
 Guide to Cully Neighborhood - PortlandNeighborhood.com
 Cully Association of Neighbors
 "Not all the city is rich in parks" by Peter Korn, Portland Tribune, August 3, 2006
 "City, schools tally Cully's deficiencies" by James Mayer, The Oregonian, November 27, 2008
Cully Street Tree Inventory Report

 
Neighborhoods in Portland, Oregon
Former census-designated places in Oregon